Several ships have been named Lord Melville after one of the Viscounts Melville:

 made six voyages as an East Indiaman for the British East India Company (EIC) before she was hulked in 1817.
 was launched in Leith. She served as a government transport, and was probably present at the Battle of Copenhagen (1807) as an armed transport. She was last listed in 1809.
In 1816 she returned to mercantile service as Lord Melville and made two voyages transporting convicts to Australia. She was last listed in 1820.
, of 372 tons (bm), was launched at Quebec; a fire at sea in 1809 destroyed her.
, of 351 tons (bm), was launched at Blythe and wrecked in 1816 in the wrecking of Sea Horse, Boadicea, and Lord Melville.
, of 230 tons (bm), was a Falmouth packet, built at Falmouth. She foundered without a trace in February 1839 after having left Halifax, Nova Scotia for Falmouth.
 was launched at Quebec and made one voyage for the EIC, two carrying convicts to Australia, and one carrying immigrants to Canada. She wrecked in 1836.

See also
 was launched at Calcutta; renamed c. 1814, as Lady Campbell she made three  voyages on behalf of the EIC; she is last listed in 1829.

Ship names
Age of Sail merchant ships of England